Mallette is a surname. Notable people with the surname include:

 Brian Mallette, American baseball pitcher
 Fanny Mallette, Canadian actress
 John Mallette (c. 1932-1995), American biologist, academic administrator and civic leader
 Mal Mallette, pitcher in Major League Baseball
 Karl L. Mallette, Toronto politician
 Malikha Mallette, dj at Power 105 (WWPR-FM)
 Troy Mallette, retired Canadian ice hockey forward
 Vital Mallette, Canadian politician

See also
 Mallett, a surname

French-language surnames